The World Monuments Watch is a flagship advocacy program of the New York-based private non-profit organization World Monuments Fund (WMF) that is dedicated to preserving the historic, artistic, and architectural heritage around the world.

Selection process
Every two years, it publishes a select list known as the Watch List of 100 Most Endangered Sites that is in urgent need of preservation funding and protection. The sites are nominated by governments, conservation professionals, site caretakers, non-government organizations (NGOs), concerned individuals, and others working in the field. An independent panel of international experts then select 100 candidates from these entries to be part of the Watch List, based on the significance of the sites, the urgency of the threat, and the viability of both advocacy and conservation solutions.  For the succeeding two-year period until a new Watch List is published, these 100 sites can avail grants and funds from the WMF, as well as from other foundations, private donors, and corporations by capitalizing on the publicity and attention gained from the inclusion on the Watch List.

2006 Watch List
The 2006 World Monuments Watch List of 100 Most Endangered Sites was launched on June 21, 2005 by WMF President Bonnie Burnham. It marked the first time that an entire country was placed on the Watch List. Iraq, long considered as the "cradle of human civilization" and within whose borders lie an estimated 10,000 archaeological sites, has been left vulnerable to widespread looting, vandalism, and other acts of violence in the wake of the 2003 military invasion.

On October 6, 2005, nearly four months after the publication of the 2006 Watch List and more than a month after the significant devastation brought about by Hurricane Katrina on America's Gulf Coast, the WMF, together with partners American Express Foundation and National Trust for Historic Preservation, decided to place the Gulf Coast and New Orleans  as the 101st endangered site on the 2006 Watch List.

List by country/territory

Statistics by country/territory
The following countries/territories have multiple sites entered on the 2006 Watch List, listed by the number of sites:

Notes

A. No official reference numbers have been designated for the sites on the Watch List.
B. Names and spellings used for the sites were based on the official 2006 Watch List as published.
C. The references to the sites' locations and periods of construction were based on the official 2006 Watch List as published.
D. On October 6, 2005, the WMF added the historic and cultural assets of the Gulf Coast and New Orleans to the 2006 Watch List as its 101st site, in the aftermath of Hurricane Katrina significantly damaging and destroying numerous historic structures across the region.
E. Tally includes the Gulf Coast and New Orleans site.

References

External links
 World Monuments Fund home page
 World Monuments Watch home page
 2006 Watch List press release
 100 Most Endangered Sites

Historic preservation
2006 works